The 2015 Austin Aces season was the 13th season of the franchise in World TeamTennis (WTT) and its second and final season in Greater Austin, Texas.

The Aces had the best regular-season record in WTT and defeated the California Dream in the Western Conference Championship Match. It was the first conference title for the franchise since 2006 (as the Newport Beach Breakers). The Aces fell in the WTT Final to the Washington Kastles who won their fifth consecutive King Trophy as WTT champions. The Aces were led by Teymuraz Gabashvili who was named WTT Male Most Valuable Player and Alla Kudryavtseva who was named WTT Female Rookie of the Year. Coach Rick Leach was named WTT Coach of the Year.

On December 14, 2015, the Aces' owner Lorne Abony announced that the team had been unable to find a suitable permanent venue and would move back to Orange County, California for the 2016 season and be renamed the Orange County Breakers. The Aces officially reported their average home attendance in 2014, as 2,155. However, general manager Allen Hardison said that the real figure may have been closer to 1,300. In 2015, the average attendance was approximately 950, even though the first 1,000 fans at the gates for the Western Conference Championship Match who had an online code were admitted for free. Hardison was complimentary of the staffs at both Cedar Park Center and Gregory Gymnasium, and he also noted that the fans who supported the Aces were "some of the best in the league." Hardison said that in order for a WTT franchise to survive, it has to have a venue that meets established criteria for location, venue type and availability, and that ideally offers an outdoor setting. Although the team's new home court was not immediately announced, officials with a desirable venue in Orange County had reportedly reached out to the Aces to lure them back.

Season recap

Draft
At the WTT draft on March 16, 2015, the Aces protected Andy Roddick in the marquee portion of the draft. In the roster portion of the draft, the Aces didn't protect any players from their 2014 roster. They selected Nicole Gibbs, Alla Kudryavtseva, Jarmere Jenkins and Teymuraz Gabashvili.

Move to Downtown Austin
On March 30, 2015, the Aces announced the team would play its 2015 home matches at the Gregory Gymnasium in Downtown Austin. The team expects that the venue, currently primarily used for women's college volleyball, will seat more than 3,500 fans when configured for tennis. Aces owner Lorne Abony said, "As soon as the 2014 season ended, we began evaluating all aspects of this team, from the record on the court to the sponsorships sold to the number of fans in the stands. From feedback we received and the analysis that was done by our front office, we felt that a relocation to a venue located closer to the city center would be in our team's best interest. We are thrilled to have been able to find a downtown home in Gregory Gym on the UT campus as the Aces work to become Austin’s premier professional sports brand and the must-attend sporting event each summer."

Roddick out for the season
On July 13, 2015, the Aces announced that their marquee player, Andy Roddick, would miss the entire 2015 season with an ankle injury. Roddick was injured in London working as a television commentator for the BBC's coverage of the 2015 Wimbledon Championships. The Aces offered all fans with paid tickets to their July 16 home opener at which Roddick was scheduled to play complementary vouchers redeemable for a tickets to a future Aces home match.

Opening day
Just hours after receiving the news that Andy Roddick would miss the season, the Aces opened up on the road against the Boston Lobsters. Teymuraz Gabashvili won the opening set of men's singles, 5–2, and Alla Kudryavtseva and Nicole Gibbs followed with a 5–4 women's doubles set win to give the Aces a 10–6 lead. After the Aces dropped the mixed doubles set, Gibbs took the fourth set in women's singles, 5–2, to give the Aces a 17–13 lead heading to the final set. Gabashvili and Jarmere Jenkins dropped the men's doubles set, 5–4, but won the first game of extended play to secure a 22–18 victory.

First match in Downtown Austin
After a successful season-opening road trip that included an upset victory over the four-time defending WTT champion Washington Kastles, the Aces returned to their new home in Downtown Austin as the only undefeated team in WTT with 2 wins and 0 losses. After the Aces lost the opening set of women's doubles, 5–2, they found themselves trailing the California Dream in the mixed doubles set, 4–2, and in the match, 9–4. But after the Dream substituted Jarmila Gajdošová for Anabel Medina Garrigues, the Aces turned the set around and took it, 5–4. It was a powerful backhand down the line by Alla Kudryavtseva to convert a break point that seemed to turn around the set and the match and get the home crowd behind the Aces. Jarmere Jenkins and Teymuraz Gabashvili took the third set of men's doubles, 5–2, and the Aces had a 12–11 halftime lead. Gajdošová took the fourth set of women's singles from Nicole Gibbs to put the Dream back in front, 16–15. But Gabashvili secured a 20–19 victory for the Aces by taking the final set of men's singles, 5–3.

Another comeback win
In their fifth match of the season, the Aces hosted the Springfield Lasers on July 18, at Gregory Gymnasium. The Lasers won the first two sets to take a 10–3 lead in the match. Alla Kudryavtseva and Teymuraz Gabashvili got the comeback started by taking the third set of mixed doubles, 5–2, to cut the Lasers' lead to 12–8. Jarmere Jenkins and Gabashvili took a tiebreaker in men's doubles for a 5–4 set win that cut the deficit to 16–13 heading to the final set. Gabashvili's powerful serve was too much for Michael Russell to handle, and a 5–2 set win in men's singles for the Aces tied the score of the match at 18. Gabashvili overwhelmed Russell in the super tiebreaker, 7–1, to earn a dramatic 19–18 victory for the Aces.

Eight-match winning streak
The Aces season-opening winning streak reached eight matches on July 22, with a 23–16 road win over the Springfield Lasers. The Aces won four of the five sets led by Nicole Gibbs who closed the match with a 5–1 set win in women's singles after earlier teaming with Alla Kudryavtseva for a 5–3 set win in women's doubles. Kudryavtseva and Teymuraz Gabashvili won the mixed doubles set, and Gabashvili opened the match by winning the men's singles set. The Aces suffered their first loss of the season the following evening against the Philadelphia Freedoms.

Clinching a playoff berth
The Aces stumbled into their July 26 home match against the defending Western Conference champion San Diego Aviators having lost their previous two matches. With an opportunity to clinch a playoff berth in front of the home fans, the Aces responded with a dominant performance winning all five sets for a 25–8 victory. In registering their biggest margin of victory of the season, the Aces earned the franchise's first playoff berth since 2012. The Aces won two sets by 5–0 scores: Nicole Gibbs in women's singles and Gibbs and Alla Kudryavtseva in women's doubles. Kudryavtseva and Teymuraz Gabashvili opened the match with a 5–3 set win in mixed doubles. Gabashvili and Jarmere Jenkins took the men's doubles, 5–2. With the Aces leading 20–5 after four sets, Jenkins made his Aces singles debut and responded with a 5–3 set win, breaking serve in the eighth game to secure the victory.

Aces sign Svitolina
On July 27, 2015, the Aces announced they had signed Elina Svitolina, the 20th ranked female player in the world at the time, as a wildcard player. With three matches remaining in the regular season, Svitolina would be eligible to play for the Aces in the playoffs if she appeared in all three of those matches. That same day, Svitolina made her Aces debut on the road against the San Diego Aviators.

A first-place finish
The Aces clinched the top seed in the Western Conference and home-court advantage for the Western Conference Championship Match on July 27, when the Washington Kastles defeated the California Dream, 19–17. Later that evening, the Aces earned a road victory against the San Diego Aviators, 25–13, in extended play to improve their record to 10 wins and 2 losses.

Best record in WTT
On July 28, 2015, the Aces welcomed the four-time defending WTT champion Washington Kastles to Gregory Gymnasium with a chance to clinch the best overall regular-season record in WTT for 2015. Trailing 10–7 after two sets, Teymuraz Gabashvili gave the Aces a 12–10 lead with a 5–0 set win over Sam Querrey in men's singles. After dropping the fourth set of mixed doubles, the Aces found themselves trailing, 15–14, heading into the final set of women's singles. Elina Svitolina, making her Aces home debut, topped Madison Brengle, 5–1, to give the Aces a 19–16 victory and the best overall regular-season record in WTT for 2015.

Western Conference championship
The Aces hosted the California Dream in the Western Conference Championship Match on July 30, 2015. The originally-scheduled start time of the match of 7:00 p.m. CDT was pushed back, because weather issues caused the Dream's flight to be delayed. The first ball was finally struck at 9:43 p.m. CDT, and the Aces took charge from the start with Teymuraz Gabashvili and Alla Kudryavtseva opening the match with a 5–2 set win in mixed doubles. Kudryavtseva and Elina Svitolina followed with a 5–3 set win in women's doubles to give the Aces a 10–5 lead. Gabashvili and Jarmere Jenkins won a tiebreaker in men's doubles to increase the Aces' lead to 15–9 at halftime. Svitolina broke Jarmila Gajdošová, the top-ranked player in WTT in women's singles during the regular season, in the fourth and sixth games of the set for a 5–1 win and a 20–10 Aces lead with one set remaining. With the clock having already struck midnight, Gabashvili served an ace to end the tiebreaker in men's singles and give the Aces a dominant 25–14 victory and the Western Conference championship. The Aces won all five sets in securing the franchise's first conference title since 2006, when they were the Newport Beach Breakers. After the match, Gabashvili said, "It was amazing. I didn’t have a lot of pressure because my team did fantastic. We found our energy and showed our best. I am feeling great on the court."

WTT Final
The Aces fell in the WTT Final on August 2, 2015, to the Washington Kastles who won their fifth consecutive King Trophy as WTT champions. The Kastles were led by WTT Final Most Valuable Player Leander Paes who teamed with Martina Hingis to take the opening set of mixed doubles from Teymuraz Gabashvili and Alla Kudryavtseva, 5–2, and then with Sam Querrey to win the men's doubles set, 5–3, over Gabashvili and Jarmere Jenkins. With the Kastles having won the first four sets and leading 20–13, Elina Svitolina faced Madison Brengle in the final set of women's singles. Svitolina fell behind a break early in the set but broke back twice for a 5–3 set win that sent the match to extended play with the Kastles leading, 23–18. Brengle hit a backhand winner in the first game of extended play to end the match and secure the title for the Kastles.

Event chronology
 March 16, 2015: The Aces protected Andy Roddick and chose Nicole Gibbs, Alla Kudryavtseva, Jarmere Jenkins and Teymuraz Gabashvili at the WTT draft.
 July 16, 2015: The Aces won their first home match at Gregory Gymnasium, 20–19, against the California Dream.
 July 26, 2015: With a record of 9 wins and 2 losses, the Aces clinched a playoff berth with a 25–8 win over the San Diego Aviators.
 July 27, 2015: The Aces signed Elina Svitolina as a wildcard player.
 July 27, 2015: With a record of 9 wins and 2 losses, the Aces clinched first place in the Western Conference and home-court advantage for the Western Conference Championship Match when the Washington Kastles defeated the California Dream, 19–17.
 July 28, 2015: With a record of 11 wins and 2 losses, the Aces clinched the best overall regular-season record in WTT with a 19–16 win over the Washington Kastles.
 July 30, 2015: The Aces won the Western Conference championship with a 25–14 home victory over the California Dream.
 August 2, 2015: The Aces lost the WTT Final to the Washington Kastles, 24–18, in extended play.
 December 14, 2015: The Aces announced that the team would move back to Orange County, California for the 2016 season and be renamed the Orange County Breakers.

Draft picks
Since the Aces had the best record among the three nonplayoff teams in 2014, they selected third in each round of the draft. Unlike previous seasons in which WTT conducted its Marquee Player Draft and its Roster Player Draft on different dates about one month apart, the league conducted a single draft at the Indian Wells Tennis Garden in Indian Wells, California on March 16, 2015. The selections made by the Aces are shown in the table below.

Match log

Regular season

{| align="center" border="1" cellpadding="2" cellspacing="1" style="border:1px solid #aaa"
|-
! colspan="2" style="background:#98000F; color:#DDFF55" | Legend
|-
! bgcolor="ccffcc" | Aces Win
! bgcolor="ffbbbb" | Aces Loss
|-
! colspan="2" | Home team in CAPS
|}

Playoffs
{| align="center" border="1" cellpadding="2" cellspacing="1" style="border:1px solid #aaa"
|-
! colspan="2" style="background:#98000F; color:#DDFF55" | Legend
|-
! bgcolor="ccffcc" | Aces Win
! bgcolor="ffbbbb" | Aces Loss
|-
! colspan="2" | Home team in CAPS
|}
Western Conference Championship Match

World TeamTennis Championship Match

Note:

Team personnel

On-court personnel
  Rick Leach – Head Coach
  Teymuraz Gabashvili
  Nicole Gibbs
  Jarmere Jenkins
  Alla Kudryavtseva
  Andy Roddick (injured, did not play)
  Elina Svitolina

Front office
 Lorne Abony – Owner
 Allen Hardison – General Manager

Statistics
Players are listed in order of their game-winning percentage provided they played in at least 40% of the Aces' games in that event, which is the WTT minimum for qualification for league leaders in individual statistical categories.

Men's singles - regular season

Women's singles - regular season

Men's doubles - regular season

Women's doubles - regular season

Mixed doubles - regular season

Team totals - regular season

Men's singles - playoffs

Women's singles - playoffs

Men's doubles - playoffs

Women's doubles - playoffs

Mixed doubles - playoffs

Team totals - playoffs

Men's singles - all matches

Women's singles - all matches

Men's doubles - all matches

Women's doubles - all matches

Mixed doubles - all matches

Team totals - all matches

Transactions
 March 16, 2015: The Aces protected Andy Roddick and chose Nicole Gibbs, Alla Kudryavtseva, Jarmere Jenkins and Teymuraz Gabashvili at the WTT draft.
 March 16, 2015: The Aces left Marion Bartoli, Eva Hrdinová, Treat Huey and Vera Zvonareva unprotected at the WTT Draft effectively making them all free agents.
 July 27, 2015: The Aces signed Elina Svitolina as a wildcard player.

Individual honors and achievements
The following table shows individual honors bestowed upon players and coaches of the Austin Aces in 2015.

Teymuraz Gabashvili led WTT in winning percentage in men's singles. He was tied with Jarmere Jenkins for fourth in men's doubles, and he was fifth in mixed doubles. Alla Kudryavtseva was third in WTT in winning percentage in mixed doubles and sixth in women's doubles. Nicole Gibbs was fifth in WTT in winning percentage in women's doubles.

See also

 World TeamTennis
 Sports in Austin, Texas

References

Austin Aces
Austin Aces 2015
Austin Aces season